Max Montana Hoetzel (born January 11, 1996) is an American-German professional basketball player who last played for Keflavík of the Úrvalsdeild karla. He played college basketball for Indiana and San Diego State.

High school career 
Montana attended Wilbraham & Monson Academy where he averaged 16 points, 8 rebounds and 4 assists as a senior.

College career 
Montana started his college career with Indiana in 2014 where he averaged 2.4 points and 1.3 rebounds in 7.7 minutes per game during his freshman season. He transferred to San Diego State in 2015 and redshirted the 2015–2016 season. During the 2016–2017 season, he averaged 7.7 points and 3.8 rebounds per game. During his junior season he averaged 6.9 points in 26 games. He missed six games after hyperextending his knee in the second game of the season. In 2018, he decided to forgo his final year of eligibility and turn pro.

Professional career 
In 2018, Montana signed with Giessen 46ers in the Basketball Bundesliga. In February 2019, Montana switched to the Hamburg Towers  where he went on to win the German second-tier Pro A.

In February 2021, Montana signed with Úrvalsdeild karla club Keflavík. On 16 March, the team terminated its contract with Montana for violations of the club's disciplinary rules. In 9 games, he averaged 9.0 points and connected on 35.5% of his three-point shots.

National team career
Montana played for the German U-18 team in 2013.

Personal life 
Montana is born to a German father and a Danish mother.

References

External links
Profile at Proballers.com
Profile at Icelandic Basketball Association
Bio at San Diego State

1996 births
Living people
American expatriate basketball people in Germany
American expatriate basketball people in Iceland
American men's basketball players
Giessen 46ers players
Hamburg Towers players
Keflavík men's basketball players
Small forwards
Basketball players from Dallas
Úrvalsdeild karla (basketball) players